Starr Labs is a musical instrument manufacturer that was founded in 1986 in San Diego, California by musician and inventor Harvey Starr, former singer and guitarist with 1960s' band The Richard Kent Style of Manchester, England.

The company manufactures a diverse product line of MIDI (Musical Instrument Digital Interface) interactive guitars, keyboards, percussion and unique music devices for professional musicians, semi-pro musicians, and music students. Current products include: Ztars keyboards guitar electronics.

The company also offers custom versions of their products for professional musicians. The guitar products range from the simple RockController, a six-string, full-fretted neck controller for music-based video games to their high-end Z6S.

References

External links
Starr Labs Official website

Guitar manufacturing companies of the United States
Manufacturing companies based in San Diego
Manufacturing companies established in 1986
1986 establishments in California